In Pursuit of the Unknown: 17 Equations That Changed the World is a 2012 nonfiction book by British mathematician Ian Stewart , published by Basic Books. In the book Stewart traced a history of the role of mathematics in human history, beginning with the Pythagorean theorem (Pythagorean equation) to the equation that transformed the twenty-first century financial market, the Black–Scholes model.

Content 
Seventeen equations are described in the book as follows:

 Pythagorean equation, 
 Logarithm product identity, 
 Derivative, 
 Newton's law of universal gravitation, 
 Imaginary unit, 
 Euler's polyhedron formula, 
 Normal distribution, 
 Wave equation in one space dimension, 
Fourier transform, 
Navier–Stokes momentum equation, 
Maxwell's equations, 
Entropy and the second law of thermodynamics, 
Mass–energy equivalence, 
Time-dependent Schrödinger equation, 
Entropy in information theory, 
Logistic map, 
Black–Scholes equation,

Reviews 
Kirkus Reviews said that the book provided "clear, cogent explanations of how the equations work without burdening the reader with cumbersome derivations."

The Maclean's magazine review described the book as a " history of the human species told in equations" by the "finest living math popularizer".

The New York Book Review said that Stewart was a "genius in the way he conveys his excitement and sense of wonder across" who has a "valuable grasp" of "what it takes to make equations interesting" and "to make science cool."

The Physics Today journal review said that Stewart writes with "easy prose, which never fails to both educate and entertain."

Business Insider described the book as an "excellent and deeply researched book."

The Association for Computing Machinery's SIGACT News review called the book, the "latest spell" by the "master storyteller", the "Honorary Wizard of the Unseen University"—the "master storyteller"—who is able to "entertain" the reader with Greek symbols. The reviewer said Stewart focused on how equations have changed the world, as new equations gave "birth to new branches of science". Stewart provides the "historical background" to explain "how the equation was anticipated", how people then "generalized the ideas and formalized the results". He highlights the ways in which these equations continue to influence our lives in the twenty-first century.

The review in Notices of the American Mathematical Society journal, described Stewart as an "experienced writer" whose intended audience is the "general literate reader"—not mathematicians. The reviewer, a mathematician, said that Stewart was "generally successful in getting the essential points across in a nontechnical way without too much distortion. However, he personally would have preferred a less "discursive style" but acknowledged that Stewart's writing was appropriate for his intended audience.

Themes

In  17 Equations, Stewart described how the Black-Scholes equation provided the "mathematical justification for the trading"—and therefore—"one ingredient in a rich stew of financial irresponsibility, political ineptitude, perverse incentives and lax regulation" that contributed to the financial crisis of 2007–08. He clarified that "the equation itself wasn't the real problem", but its abuse in the financial industry.

See also

References

2012 non-fiction books
Basic Books books
Books by Ian Stewart (mathematician)
Mathematics books
Profile Books books